Björn Goldschmidt (born 3 December 1979 in Karlsruhe) is a German sprint canoer who has competed since the early 2000s. Competing in two Summer Olympics, he won a bronze medal in the K-4 1000 m event at Beijing in 2008.

Goldschmidt also won two medals at the ICF Canoe Sprint World Championships with a gold (K-4 200 m: 2007) and a silver (K-4 200 m: 2005).

References
Beijing2008 profile

1979 births
Canoeists at the 2004 Summer Olympics
Canoeists at the 2008 Summer Olympics
German male canoeists
Living people
Olympic canoeists of Germany
Olympic bronze medalists for Germany
Olympic medalists in canoeing
ICF Canoe Sprint World Championships medalists in kayak
Medalists at the 2008 Summer Olympics
Sportspeople from Karlsruhe